Rogachevo may refer to:
Rogachevo, Bulgaria, a village in Dobrich Province, Bulgaria
Rogachevo, Russia, several rural localities in Russia
Rogachevo (air base), an air base on Novaya Zemlya, Russia